Adventist Girls' High School (formerly Ntonso Senior High School), is a Ghanaian girls' senior high school at Ntonso in the Kwabre East District of the Ashanti Region.

See also

 Education in Ghana
 List of senior high schools in the Ashanti Region
 List of Seventh-day Adventist secondary schools

References

Educational institutions established in 1998
1998 establishments in Ghana
Ashanti Region
Christian schools in Ghana
Girls' schools in Ghana
High schools in Ghana
Secondary schools affiliated with the Seventh-day Adventist Church